Henry Brooks Adams (February 16, 1838 – March 27, 1918) was an American historian and a member of the Adams political family, descended from two U.S. presidents. As a young Harvard graduate, he served as secretary to his father, Charles Francis Adams, Abraham Lincoln's ambassador to the United Kingdom.  The posting influenced the younger man through the experience of wartime diplomacy, and absorption in English culture, especially the works of John Stuart Mill. After the American Civil War, he became a political journalist who entertained America's foremost intellectuals at his homes in Washington and Boston.

During his lifetime, he was best known for The History of the United States of America 1801–1817, a nine-volume work, praised for its literary style, command of the documentary evidence, and deep (family) knowledge of the period and its major figures. His posthumously published memoir, The Education of Henry Adams, won the Pulitzer Prize and went on to be named by the Modern Library as the best English-language nonfiction book of the 20th century.

Early life
He was born in Boston on February 16, 1838, into one of the country's most prominent families. His parents were Charles Francis Adams Sr. (1807–1886) and Abigail Brooks (1808–1889). Both his paternal grandfather, John Quincy Adams, and great-grandfather, John Adams, one of the most prominent among the Founding Fathers, had been U.S. Presidents. His maternal grandfather, Peter Chardon Brooks, was one of Massachusetts' most successful and wealthiest merchants. Another great-grandfather, Nathaniel Gorham, signed the Constitution.

After his graduation from Harvard University in 1858, he embarked on a grand tour of Europe, during which he also attended lectures in civil law at the University of Berlin. 

In his 50s, he was initiated into the Phi Kappa Psi fraternity as an honorary member at the 1893 Columbian Exposition by Harris J. Ryan, a judge for the exhibit on electrical engineering. Through that organization, he was a member of the Irving Literary Society.

During the Civil War
Adams returned home from Europe in the midst of the heated presidential election of 1860. He tried his hand again at law, taking employment with Judge Horace Gray's Boston firm, but this was short-lived.

His father, Charles Francis Adams Sr., was also seeking re-election to the US House of Representatives. After his successful re-election, Charles Francis asked Henry to be his private secretary, continuing a father-son pattern set by John and John Quincy and suggesting that Charles Francis had chosen Henry as the political scion of that generation of the family. Henry shouldered the responsibility reluctantly and with much self-doubt. "[I] had little to do", he reflected later, "and knew not how to do it rightly."

During this time, Adams was the anonymous Washington correspondent for Charles Hale's Boston Daily Advertiser.

London (1861–68) 
On March 19, 1861, Abraham Lincoln appointed Charles Francis Adams Sr. United States Ambassador to the United Kingdom. Henry accompanied his father to London as his private secretary. He also became the anonymous London correspondent for The New York Times. The two Adamses were kept very busy, monitoring Confederate diplomatic intrigues and trying to obstruct the construction of Confederate commerce raiders by British shipyards (see Alabama Claims). Henry's writings for the Times argued that Americans should be patient with the British. While in Britain, Adams was befriended by many noted men, including Charles Lyell, Francis T. Palgrave, Richard Monckton Milnes, James Milnes Gaskell, and Charles Milnes Gaskell. He worked to introduce the young Henry James to English society, with the help of his closest and lifelong friend Charles Milnes Gaskell and his wife Lady Catherine (nee Wallop).

While in Britain, Henry read and was taken with the works of John Stuart Mill. For Adams, Mill's Considerations on Representative Government showed the necessity of an enlightened, moral, and intelligent elite to provide leadership to a government elected by the masses and subject to demagoguery, ignorance, and corruption. Henry wrote to his brother Charles that Mill demonstrated to him that "democracy is still capable of rewarding a conscientious servant." His years in London led Adams to conclude that he could best provide that knowledgeable and conscientious leadership by working as a correspondent and journalist.

Return to America

In 1868, Adams returned to the United States and settled in Washington, DC, where he began working as a journalist. Adams saw himself as a traditionalist longing for the democratic ideal of the 17th and 18th centuries. Accordingly, he was keen on exposing political corruption in his journalism.

Harvard professor 
In 1870, Adams was appointed professor of medieval history at Harvard, a position he held until his early retirement in 1877 at 39. As an academic historian, Adams is considered to have been the first (in 1874–1876) to conduct historical seminar work in the United States. Among his students was Henry Cabot Lodge, who worked closely with Adams as a graduate student.

Adams was elected a Fellow of the American Academy of Arts and Sciences in 1875.

Author 
Adams's The History of the United States of America (1801 to 1817) (9 vols., 1889–1891) is a highly detailed history of the Jefferson and Madison administrations with a focus on diplomacy. Wide praise was given for its literary merit, especially the opening five chapters of volume 1, describing the nation in 1800. These chapters have also been criticized; Noble Cunningham states flatly, "Adams misjudged the state of the nation in 1800." In striving for literary effect, Cunningham argues, Adams ignored the dynamism and sophistication of the new nation.  Such arguments aside, historians have long recognized it as a major and permanent monument of American historiography.  It has been called "a neglected masterpiece" by Garry Wills, and "a history yet to be replaced" by the great historian C. Vann Woodward.

In the 1880s, Adams wrote two novels, starting with Democracy, which was published anonymously in 1880 and immediately became popular in literary circles in England and Europe as well as in America. (Only after Adams's death did his publisher reveal his authorship.) His other novel, published under the nom de plume of Frances Snow Compton, was Esther, whose heroine was believed to be modeled after his wife.

During the late 1860s and early 1870s, Adams edited, with the assistance of his brother Charles Francis Adams, the major American intellectual-literary journal, The North American Review.  During his tenure it published a number of articles exposing corrupt malpractices in finance, corporations and government, anticipating the work of the "muckrakers" by a generation.  The brothers collected several of their most important essays in Chapters Of Erie (1871).  This experience marked the public commencement of Henry Adams' critical observation of, and radical disenchantment with, the operations and ascendancy of corporations and centralized finance in the economic, social and political life of America. Summarizing the observations of a lifetime, he wrote to his brother Brooks on September 20, 1910 (vol. 6, pp. 369-370, Letters, ed. Levenson et al.):  "Our system of protection [of industry and commerce]... is fatal to our principles....  Railways, trusts, banking-system, manufactures, capital and labor, all rest on the principle of monopoly ...  The suggestion that these great corporate organisms, which now perform all the vital functions of our social life, should behave themselves decently, gives away our contention that they have no right to exist.  Nor am I prepared to admit that more decency can be attained through a legislature made up of similar people exercising similar illegal powers....  From top to bottom the whole system is a fraud....  The conviction of having reached this point where we have no choice but to go on in our own rot, drove me out of all share in public affairs twenty years ago..  Every one who has assumed such a share since then has only muddled and made the matter worse."

In 1884, Adams was elected a member of the American Antiquarian Society. In 1892, he received the degree LL.D., from Western Reserve University. In 1894, Adams was elected president of the American Historical Association. His address, entitled "The Tendency of History," was delivered in absentia. The essay predicted the development of a scientific approach to history, but was somewhat ambiguous as to what this achievement might mean.

During the 1890s, Adams exercised a profound and fruitful influence over the thought and writings of his younger brother Brooks. Brooks' essay, "The Degradation of the Democratic Dogma," an offshoot of their decades long conversations and correspondence, was published years later.

Adams was an accomplished poet and in later life a friend of young poets—notably George Cabot Lodge and Trumbull Stickney—but published nothing in his lifetime. His important poems "Buddha and Brahma" and "Prayers to the Virgin and the Dynamo" are included (respectively) in the Library of America's Nineteenth and Twentieth Century Anthologies, and a half dozen sonnets, a Troubadour translation, and one lyric are scattered through the letters. It is an open question whether the Massachusetts Historical Society or other archives preserve more.

In 1904, Adams privately published a copy of his "Mont Saint Michel and Chartres", a pastiche of history, travel, and poetry that celebrated the unity of medieval society, especially as represented in the great cathedrals of France. Originally meant as a diversion for his nieces and "nieces-in-wish", it was publicly released in 1913 at the request of Ralph Adams Cram, an important American architect, and published with support of the American Institute of Architects.

He published The Education of Henry Adams in 1907, in a small private edition for selected friends. Only following Adams's death was The Education made available to the general public, in an edition issued by the Massachusetts Historical Society. It ranked first on the Modern Library's 1998 list of 100 Best Nonfiction Books and was named the best book of the 20th century by the Intercollegiate Studies Institute, a conservative organization that promotes classical education. It was awarded the Pulitzer Prize in 1919.

Some center-right intellectuals view the book critically. Conservative journalist Fred Siegel considered the worldview expressed therein to be rooted in resentment of America's middle class. "Henry Adams," wrote Siegel, "grounded the intellectual's alienation from American life in the resentment that superior men feel when they are insufficiently appreciated in America's common-man culture."  Others view  Adams's critique of the commercialism, corruption and pecuniolatry of American mercantile culture as central.

Personal life

Relations

Siblings 
John Quincy Adams II (1833–1894) was a graduate of Harvard (1853), practiced law, and was a Democratic member for several terms of the Massachusetts general court.  In 1872, he was nominated for vice president by the Democratic faction that refused to support the nomination of Horace Greeley.

Charles Francis Adams Jr. (1835–1915) fought with the Union in the Civil War, receiving in 1865 the brevet of brigadier general in the regular army. He became an authority on railway management as the author of Railroads, Their Origin and Problems (1878), and as president of the Union Pacific Railroad from 1884 to 1890.  He collaborated with Henry on the editing of The North Atlantic Review and other projects.

Brooks Adams (1848–1927) practiced law and became a writer. His books include The Gold Standard (1894), The Law of Civilization and Decay (1895), America's Economic Supremacy (1900), The New Empire (1902),  The Theory of Social Revolutions (1914), and The Emancipation of Massachusetts (1919).  Henry's influence on and involvement with his youngest brother's thought and writing was profound and enduring.

Louisa Catherine Adams Kuhn Her brother describes her death in 1870 from tetanus following a carriage accident in Bagni di Lucca in his Chaos Chapter of The Education of Henry Adams. She is buried in Florence's 'English' Cemetery.

Social life and friendships 
Adams was a member of an exclusive circle, a group of friends called the "Five of Hearts" that consisted of Henry, his wife Clover, geologist and mountaineer Clarence King, John Hay (assistant to Lincoln and later Secretary of State), and Hay's wife Clara.

One of Adams's frequent travel companions was the artist John La Farge, with whom he journeyed to Japan and the South Seas.

From 1885 until 1888, Theodore Frelinghuysen Dwight (1846–1917), the State Department's chief librarian, lived with Adams at his home at 1603 H Street in Washington, D.C., where he served as Adams's literary assistant, personal secretary, and household manager.  Dwight would go on to serve as archivist of the Adams family archives in Quincy, Massachusetts; director of the Boston Public Library; and U.S. Consul at Vevey, Switzerland.

Marriage to Marian "Clover" Hooper 
On June 27, 1872, Adams married Clover Hooper in Beverly, Massachusetts. They spent their honeymoon in Europe, much of it with Charles Milnes Gaskell at Wenlock Abbey, Shropshire.  While there, exemplifying the New England civic conscience she and Henry shared, Clover wrote "England is charming for a few families but hopeless for most ...  Thank the Lord that the American eagle flaps and screams over us." Upon their return, Adams went back to his position at Harvard, and their home at 91 Marlborough Street, Boston, became a gathering place for a lively circle of intellectuals. In 1877, his wife and he moved to Washington, DC, where their home on Lafayette Square, across from the White House, again became a dazzling and witty center of social life. He worked as a journalist and continued working as a historian.

Her suicide 
On Sunday morning, December 6, 1885, after a late breakfast at their home, 1607 H Street on Lafayette Square, Clover Hooper Adams went to her room. Henry, troubled by a toothache, had planned to see his dentist. While departing his home, he was met by a woman calling to see his wife. Adams went upstairs to her room to ask if she would receive the visitor and found his wife lying on a rug before the fire; an opened vial of potassium cyanide, which Clover had frequently used in processing photographs, lay nearby. Adams carried his wife to a sofa, then ran for a doctor. Shortly thereafter, Dr. Charles E. Hagner pronounced Clover dead.

Much speculation and numerous theories have been given concerning the causes of Clover Adams's suicide. Her death has been attributed to depression over her father's death, as well as a family history of mental depression and suicide . Posthumous speculation has been made more difficult by Henry Adams's destruction of most of Clover's letters and photos following her death. His autobiography maintains a profound silence about his wife after her suicide. Adams's grief was profound and enduring. The event was life-shattering for Adams and profoundly altered the course of his life.

Henry, his brother, Charles Francis Adams, Clover's brother Edward, and her sister Ellen, with her husband Ephraim Gurney, were the attendees at a brief funeral service held on December 9, 1885, at the house on Lafayette Square. Interment services followed at Rock Creek Cemetery, but the actual burial was postponed until December 11, 1885, because of the inclement weather. A few weeks later, Adams ordered a modest headstone as a temporary marker. Later he commissioned a monument for her tomb from his friend, the sculptor Augustus Saint-Gaudens, who created a masterpiece for her memorial.

Relationship with Elizabeth Sherman Cameron 
Henry Adams first met Elizabeth Cameron in January 1881 at a reception in the drawing room of the house of John and Clara Hay. Elizabeth was considered to be one of the most beautiful and intelligent women in the Washington area. Elizabeth had grown up as Lizzie Sherman, the daughter of Judge Charles Sherman of Ohio, the niece of Secretary of the Treasury John Sherman in Hayes's cabinet, and the niece of General William Tecumseh Sherman. The arranged marriage on May 9, 1878, united the reluctant 20-year-old beauty with a 44-year-old widower with six children. Eliza, his eldest, who had served as her father's hostess, was now displaced by a stepmother the same age. The children never accepted her. The marriage was further strained by the Senator's coarseness and indifference and his fondness for bourbon and the world of political corruption he inhabited, which is reflected in Adams's novel Democracy.

Henry Adams initiated a correspondence with Lizzie on May 19, 1883, when she and her husband departed for Europe. That letter reflected his unhappiness with her departure and his longing for her return. It was the first of hundreds to follow for the next 35 years, recording a passionate yet unconsummated relationship. On December 7, 1884, one year before Clover's suicide, Henry Adams wrote to Lizzie, "I shall dedicate my next poem to you. I shall have you carved over the arch of my stone doorway. I shall publish your volume of extracts with your portrait on the title page. None of these methods can fully express the extent to which I am yours."

Adams's wife, Clover, who had written a weekly letter to her father throughout her marriage except for the brief hiatus during her breakdown along the Nile, never mentioned concerns or suspicions about Henry's relationship with Lizzie. Nothing in the letters of her family or circle of friends indicates her distrust or unhappiness with her husband in this matter. Indeed, after her death, Henry found a letter from Clover to her sister Ellen which had not been posted. The survival of this letter was assured by its contents which read, "If I had one single point of character or goodness, I would stand on that and grow back to life. Henry is more patient and loving than words can express—God might envy him—he bears and hopes and despairs hour after hour—Henry is beyond all words tenderer and better than all of you even."

On Christmas Day 1885, Adams sent one of Clover's favorite pieces of jewelry to Cameron, requesting that she "sometimes wear it, to remind you of her."

Later life
Just before the end of 1885, Adams moved into his newly-completed mansion next door  at 1603 H Street, which was designed by Henry Hobson Richardson, an old friend of Adams and one of the most prominent architects of his day. (The house was razed in 1927 and the Hay-Adams Hotel was built on the site.)

Following his wife's death, Adams took up a restless life as a globetrotter, traveling extensively, spending summers in Paris and winters in Washington, D.C., where he commissioned the Adams Memorial designed by sculptor Augustus Saint-Gaudens and architect Stanford White for her grave site in Rock Creek Cemetery in Washington, D.C..

Death and burial 
After the stroke, his scholarly output diminished, but he continued to travel, write letters, and host dignitaries and friends at his Washington, D.C., home.

In the first volume of her autobiography, Eleanor Roosevelt offers this vignette of Adams in old age: "Occasionally we received one of the much-coveted invitations to lunch or dine at his house...  My first picture of this supposedly stern, rather biting Mr. Adams is of an old gentleman in a victoria outside of our house on N Street.  [His secretary] Aileen Tone and I were having tea inside, but Mr. Adams never paid calls.  He did, however, request that the children of the house come out and join him in the victoria; ... and they brought their Scottie dog and sat and chatted and played all over the vehicle.  No one was ever able thereafter to persuade me that Mr. Adams was quite the cynic he was supposed to be.  One day after lunch with him, my husband [the future President] mentioned something which at the time was causing him deep concern in the Government, and Mr. Adams looked at him rather fiercely and said:  'Young man, I have lived in this house many years and seen the occupants of that White House across the square come and go, and nothing that you minor officials or the occupant of that house can do will affect the history of the world for long!' ...  Henry Adams loved to shock his hearers, and I think he knew that those who were worth their salt would understand him and pick out of the knowledge which flowed from his lips the things which might be useful, and discard the cynicism as an old man's defense against his own urge to be [still] an active factor in the work of the world."

On March 27, 1918, Adams died in Washington, D.C., at age 80. He was interred beside his wife in Rock Creek Cemetery, Washington, D.C.

Views

Anglo-Saxonism
Considered a prominent Anglo-Saxonist of particularly the nineteenth-century, Adams has been portrayed by modern historians as anxious about the immigration of the era into the United States, particularly from Eastern Europe. More starkly put, Adams also wrote of his belief that "the dark races are gaining on us". He considered the U.S. Constitution itself as belonging to the Anglo-Saxon "race", and as an expression of "Germanic freedom". He went so far as to criticize fellow scholars for not being absolute enough in their Anglo-Saxonism, such as William Stubbs, whom he criticized for downplaying the significance, as he saw it, of "Germanic law" or hundred law in its contribution to English common law.

Adams was nevertheless highly critical of the English.  He referred to them as a "besotted race" from whom nothing good could come and "wanted nothing so much as to wipe England off the earth."

Antisemitism
Adams's attitude towards Jews has been described as one of loathing. John Hay said that when Adams "saw Vesuvius reddening ... [he] searched for a Jew stoking the fire."

Adams wrote: "I detest [the Jews], and everything connected with them, and I live only and solely with the hope of seeing their demise, with all their accursed Judaism. I want to see all the lenders at interest taken out and executed." To one friend, he wrote: "Bombard New York. I know no place that would be more improved by it. The chief population is Jew, and the rest is German Jew."

His letters were "peppered with a variety of antisemitic remarks", according to historian Robert Michael, as in the following citations from historian Edward Saveth:

"We are in the hands of the Jews", Adams lamented. "They can do what they please with our values." He advised against investment except in the form of gold locked in a safe deposit box. "There you have no risk but the burglar. In any other form you have the burglar, the Jew, the Czar, the socialist, and, above all, the total irremediable, radical rottenness of our whole social, industrial, financial and political system." 

Edward Chalfant's definitive three-volume biography of Adams includes an exhaustive, well-documented examination of Adams's "antisemitism" in its second volume, Improvement of the World. He shows that most of the time when Adams says "Jews" he means "financiers." This accords with the historical English usage referenced by the second definition under the Oxford English Dictionary entry, a usage that was common in Adams's time and social milieu. It also accords with Adams's frequent laments that "the eighteenth-century fabric of a priori, or moral, principles" had been replaced with "a bankers' world" and that the "banking mind was obnoxious".

Adams esteemed individual Jewish personages. In the "Dilettantism" chapter of The Education of Henry Adams he wrote of historian Francis Palgrave that "the reason of his superiority lay in his name, which was Cohen, and his mind which was Cohen also". (Palgrave, the son of a Jewish stockbroker, had changed his name from Cohen upon marriage.)  In the "Political Morality" chapter of the same volume he praises the Jewish statesman Benjamin Disraeli over the Gentiles Palmerston, Russell and Gladstone, writing: "Complex these gentlemen were not. Disraeli alone might, by contrast, be called complex."

Historical entropy 

In 1910, Adams printed and distributed to university libraries and history professors the small volume A Letter to American Teachers of History proposing a "theory of history" based on the second law of thermodynamics and the principle of entropy. This, essentially, states that all energy dissipates, order becomes disorder, and the earth will eventually become uninhabitable. In short, he applied the physics of dynamical systems of Rudolf Clausius, Hermann von Helmholtz, and William Thomson to the modeling of human history.

In his 1909 manuscript The Rule of Phase Applied to History, Adams attempted to use Maxwell's demon as a historical metaphor, though he seems to have misunderstood and misapplied the principle. Adams interpreted history as a process moving towards "equilibrium", but he saw militaristic nations (he felt Germany pre-eminent in this class) as tending to reverse this process, a "Maxwell's Demon of history."

Adams made many attempts to respond to the criticism of his formulation from his scientific colleagues, but the work remained incomplete at Adams's death in 1918. It was published posthumously.

Robert E. Lee 
Adams said, "I think that Lee should have been hanged. It was all the worse that he was a good man and a fine character and acted conscientiously. It's always the good men who do the most harm in the world."

The Virgin Mary 
In Mont Saint-Michel and Chartres, Adams argues that the previous nineteen hundred years of civilization dating from the birth of Christ had been dominated by the feminine, fertile image of the Blessed Virgin, and that the industrial "dynamo" was a masculine, destructive force which would upend history.

Writings by Adams
 1876. Essays in Anglo-Saxon Law (with Henry Cabot Lodge, Ernest Young and J.L. Laughlin)
 1879. Life of Albert Gallatin
 1879. The Writings of Albert Gallatin (as editor, three volumes)
 1880. Democracy: An American Novel
 1882. John Randolph
 1884. Esther: A Novel (facsimile ed., 1938, Scholars' Facsimiles & Reprints)
 1889–1891. History of the United States During the Administrations of Thomas Jefferson and James Madison (nine volumes)
 1891. Historical Essays
 1893. Tahiti: Memoirs of Arii Taimai e Marama of Eimee ... Last Queen of Tahiti (facsimile of the 1901 Paris ed., 1947 Scholars' Facsimiles & Reprints)
 1904. Mont Saint Michel and Chartres
 1911. The Life of George Cabot Lodge (facsimile ed. 1978, Scholars' Facsimiles & Reprints)
 1918. The Education of Henry Adams
 1919. The Degradation of the Democratic Dogma
 1930–1938. Letters (Edited by W.C. Ford, two volumes)
 1982. The Letters of Henry Adams, Volumes 1–3: 1858–1892 (Edited by J.C. Levenson, Ernest Samuels and Charles Vandersee)
 1988. The Letters of Henry Adams, Volumes 4–6: 1892–1918 (Edited by J.C. Levenson, Ernest Samuels and Charles Vandersee)

Reprinted
Democracy: An American Novel, Esther, Mont Saint Michel and Chartres, The Education of Henry Adams (Ernest Samuels, ed.) (Library of America, 1983) 
History of the United States During the Administrations of Thomas Jefferson and James Madison (Earl N. Harbert, ed.) (Library of America, 1986) Vol I (Jefferson) . Vol II (Madison)

See also
Maxwell's demon
The Education of Henry Adams

References

Further reading

 Adams, James Truslow (1933). Henry Adams. New York: Albert & Charles Boni, Inc.
 Adams, Marian Hooper (1936). The Letters of Mrs. Henry Adams, 1865–1883. Boston: Little, Brown, and Co. (Edited by W. Thoron).
 Baym, Max Isaac (1951). The French Education of Henry Adams. Columbia University Press.
Boyd, Kelly, ed. Encyclopedia of Historians and Historical Writers (Rutledge, 1999) 1:2–4
 Brookhiser, Richard (2002). America's First Dynasty: The Adamses, 1735–1918. New York: Free Press.
 Brown, David S. (2020). The Last American Aristocrat: The Brilliant Life and Improbable Education of Henry Adams. Scribner.
 Cater, H.D., ed., (1947). Henry Adams and His Friends: A Collection of His Unpublished Letters. Boston: Houghton Mifflin Company.
 Chalfant, Edward (1982). Both Sides of the Ocean: A biography of Henry Adams, His First Life, 1838–1862. Hamden, Connecticut: Archon Books 
 Chalfant, Edward (1994). Better in Darkness: A Biography of Henry Adams, His Second Life, 1862–1891. Hamden, Connecticut: Archon Books 
 Chalfant, Edward (2001). Improvement of the World: A Biography of Henry Adams, His Third Life, 1891–1918. Hamden, Connecticut: Archon Books .
 Decker, William Merrill (1990). The Literary Vocation of Henry Adams. University of North Carolina Press.
 Donovan, Timothy Paul (1961). Henry Adams and Brooks Adams: The Education of Two American Historians. University of Oklahoma Press.
 Dusinberre, William (1980). Henry Adams: The Myth of Failure. Charlottesville: University Press of Virginia.
 Egerton, Douglas R. (2019). Heirs of an Honored Name: The Decline of the Adams Family and the Rise of Modern America. New York: Basic Books.
 Georgini, Sara (2019). Household Gods: The Religious Lives of the Adams Family. Oxford University Press. 
 Harbert, Earl N. (1977). The Force So Much Closer Home: Henry Adams and the Adams Family. New York University Press.
 Harbert, Earl N., ed. (1981). Critical Essays on Henry Adams. Boston: G.K. Hall. Contributors include Henry Steele Commager, Ernest Samuels, Howard M. Munford, and Margaret J. Brown.
 Hochfield, George (1962). Henry Adams: An Introduction and Interpretation. New York: Holt, Rinehart, and Winston.
 Hume, Robert A. (1951). Runaway Star: An Appreciation of Henry Adams. Cornell University Press.
 Jacobson, Joanne (1992). Authority and Alliance in the Letters of Henry Adams. University of Wisconsin Press.
 Jordy, William H. (1952). Henry Adams: Scientific Historian. New Haven: Yale University Press. OCLC 427157
 Kaplan, Harold (1981). Power and Order: Henry Adams and the Naturalist Tradition in American Fiction. University of Chicago Press.
 Le Clair, Robert Charles (1978). Three American Travellers in England: James Russell Lowell, Henry Adams, Henry James. Westport, Conn.: Greenwood Press.
 Levenson, J.C. (1957). The Mind and Art of Henry Adams. Boston: Houghton Mifflin.
 Lyon, Melvin (1970). Symbol and Idea in Henry Adams. University of Nebraska Press.
 O'Toole, Patricia (1990). The Five of Hearts: An Intimate Portrait of Henry Adams and His Friends, 1880–1918. New York: Clarkson. N. Potter.
 Rowe, John Carlos, ed., (1996). New Essays on the Education of Henry Adams. Cambridge University Press.
 Samuels, Ernest (1948). The Young Henry Adams. Cambridge: The Belknap Press of Harvard University Press.
 Samuels, Ernest (1958). Henry Adams: The Middle Years. Cambridge: The Belknap Press of Harvard University Press.
 Samuels, Ernest (1964). Henry Adams: The Major Phase. Cambridge: The Belknap Press of Harvard University Press.
 Samuels, Ernest (1989). Henry Adams. Cambridge: The Belknap Press of Harvard University Press. (Abridgement of the three above volumes.)
 Sayre, Robert F. (1964). Examined Self: Benjamin Franklin, Henry Adams, Henry James. Princeton University Press.
 Scheyer, Ernst (1970). The Circle of Henry Adams: Art & Artists. Wayne State University Press.
 Simpson, Brooks D. (1996). The Political Education of Henry Adams. Columbia: University of South Carolina Press.
 Stegmaier, Mark J. (2012). Henry Adams in the Secession Crisis. Louisiana State University Press.  
 Wagner, Vern (1969). The Suspension of Henry Adams: A Study of Manner and Matter. Wayne State University Press.
 Wasserstrom, William (1984). The Ironies of Progress: Henry Adams and the American Dream. Southern Illinois University Press.
 Wills, Garry (2005). Henry Adams and the Making of America. Boston: Houghton Mifflin Co. 
 Young, James P. (2001). Henry Adams: The Historian as Political Theorist. University Press of Kansas.
 Zencey, Eric (1995). Panama. New York: Farrar, Straus & Giroux

External links

 
 
 
 
 Works by Henry Adams, at Hathi Trust
 Works by Henry Adams, at The University of Virginia American Studies Hypertext Project
 The Letters of Henry Adams
 Henry Adams, Globe Trotter in Space and Time 
 
 Index entry for Henry Brooks Adams at Poets' Corner
 The Broken Arch, an unpublished work by Lorrie Tussman exploring the theme of unity in Western civilization based on the writings of Henry Adams
"Writings of Henry Adams" from C-SPAN's American Writers: A Journey Through History
 

1838 births
1918 deaths
19th-century American historians
19th-century American male writers
19th-century American novelists
Adams political family
American expatriates in France
American male novelists
Burials at Rock Creek Cemetery
Fellows of the American Academy of Arts and Sciences
Harvard University faculty
Harvard University alumni
Historians of the United States
Humboldt University of Berlin alumni
Members of the American Academy of Arts and Letters
Members of the American Antiquarian Society
Novelists from Massachusetts
Presidents of the American Historical Association
Pulitzer Prize for Biography or Autobiography winners
Writers from Boston
American male biographers
American male non-fiction writers